Joan Beaufort ( 1404 – 15 July 1445) was Queen of Scotland from 1424 to 1437 as the spouse of King James I of Scotland. During part of the minority of her son James II (from 1437 to 1439), she served as the regent of Scotland.

Background and early life 

Joan Beaufort was a daughter of John Beaufort, 1st Earl of Somerset, a legitimised son of John of Gaunt by his mistress (and later third wife) Katherine Swynford. Joan's mother was Margaret Holland, the granddaughter of Joan of Kent (wife of Edward the Black Prince) from her earlier marriage to Thomas Holland, 1st Earl of Kent. Joan was also a half-niece of King Henry IV of England, first cousin once removed of Richard II, and great-granddaughter of Edward III. Her uncle, Henry Beaufort, was a cardinal and Chancellor of England.

King James I of Scotland met Joan during his time as a prisoner in England, and knew her from at least 1420. She is said to have been the inspiration for King James's famous long poem, The Kingis Quair, written during his captivity, after he saw her from his window in the garden. The marriage was at least partially political, as their marriage was part of the agreement for his release from captivity. From an English perspective an alliance with the Beauforts was meant to establish Scotland's alliance with the English, rather than the French. Negotiations resulted in Joan's dowry of 10,000 marks being subtracted from James's substantial ransom.

Queen of Scotland
On 12 February 1424, Joan Beaufort and King James were wed at St Mary Overie Church in Southwark. They were feasted at Winchester Palace that year by her uncle, Cardinal Henry Beaufort. She accompanied her husband on his return from captivity in England to Scotland, and was crowned alongside her husband at Scone Abbey. As queen, she often pleaded with the king for those who might be executed.

The royal couple had eight children, including the future James II, and Margaret of Scotland, future spouse of Louis XI of France.

Regency 
James I was assassinated in Perth on 21 February 1437. Joan had also been a target of assassination along with her husband, but managed to survive her injuries. She successfully directed her husband's supporters to attack his assassin Walter Stewart, Earl of Atholl, but was forced to give up power three months later. The prospect of being ruled by an English woman was unpopular in Scotland. The Earl of Douglas was thus appointed to power, though Joan remained in charge of her son.

Near the end of July 1439, she married James Stewart, the Black Knight of Lorne after obtaining a papal dispensation for both consanguinity and affinity. James was an ally of the latest Earl of Douglas, and plotted with him to overthrow Alexander Livingston, governor of Stirling Castle, during the minority of James II. Livingston arrested Joan in August 1439 and forced her to relinquish custody of the young king. In 1445, the conflict between the Douglas/Livingston faction and the queen's supporters resumed, and she was under siege at Dunbar Castle by the Earl of Douglas when she died on 15 July 1445. She was buried in the Carthusian Priory at Perth.

Issue 
With James I of Scotland:
 Margaret Stewart, Princess of Scotland (1424–1445) married Prince Louis, Dauphin of Viennois (later King Louis XI of France)
 Isabella Stewart, Princess of Scotland (1426–1494) married Francis I, Duke of Brittany
 Mary Stewart, Countess of Buchan (c. 1428 – 1465) married Wolfart VI van Borsselen
 Joan of Scotland, Countess of Morton (c. 1428–1486) married James Douglas, 1st Earl of Morton
 Alexander Stewart, Duke of Rothesay (born and died 1430); twin of James
 James II of Scotland (1430–1460)
 Annabella Stewart, Princess of Scotland (c. 1436 – 1509) married and divorced 1. Louis of Savoy, and then married and divorced 2. George Gordon, 2nd Earl of Huntly
 Eleanor Stewart, Princess of Scotland (1433–1484) married Sigismund, Archduke of Austria
With James Stewart, the Black Knight of Lorne:
 John Stewart, 1st Earl of Atholl (c. 1440 – 1512)
 James Stewart, 1st Earl of Buchan (1442–1499)
 Andrew Stewart, Bishop of Moray (c. 1443 – 1501)

Ancestry

Notes

References

 

 

|-

1404 births
1445 deaths
15th-century Scottish women
15th-century Scottish people
15th-century viceregal rulers
Beaufort family
House of Stuart
Scottish royal consorts
15th-century women rulers
Daughters of British earls
Regents of Scotland
Remarried royal consorts
Queen mothers